Daman is one of the most beautiful tourist attraction in Thaha Municipality, Makwanpur District, central Nepal.

Daman has among the greatest views of the Himalayas, extending on a good day from Dhaulagiri in the west to Mount Everest in the east.

The village also contains the Everest Panorama Resort, which includes a helipad. Since the village lies on the outskirts of Kathmandu, it provides a great opportunity for the people residing in Kathmandu to observe its beauty and use it for means of recreation. Also, during winter, snowfall occurs in the hills, augmenting the beauty of the village. There is religious site near called Risheshor Mahadev Temple. It is said that when Lord Shiva was mourning and lamenting, carrying dead body of his beloved wife Satidevi, he rested here. Being so thirsty he just hit the big rock with his weapon (trisula) and water came out. So still we can see the water flowing in between the big rocks. The main festival occurs in  Fagu Purnima and Thulo Ekadashi. There is a beautiful botanical garden in Daman which is one of the biggest and oldest botanical garden in Nepal. Different varieties of Rhododendron are available here.

There are many picnic spots for outings. It can be visited just as a one-day trip or stay a few more days, taking some deep breaths from the hustle and bustle of the city life. There are so many hotels, resorts and lodges for accommodation. There are the best services at most reasonable rates; choose any of them which fits a budget.

More than 90% of the people living in Daman are dependent on agriculture and rest of them on hotel business and other. People here are so helpful and kind. So Daman is one of the most visit place for everyone.

External links

References

Populated places in Makwanpur District
Hill stations in Nepal